Mahmoud Ibrahim Mahmoud Hegazy (born 11 May 1956) is an Egyptian general who was the Chief of Staff of the Egyptian Armed Forces from 2014 to 2017. Hegazy graduated from the Egyptian Military Academy in 1977, and served as the Chief of the Egyptian Military intelligence before his appointment as Chief of Staff by the president of Egypt, Abdel Fattah el-Sisi.  He is related to Sisi through the marriage of their respective children.  Mahmoud Hegazy was replaced in 2017 by Mohammed Farid Hegazy in a shakeup of high level security personnel. No reason was given for the changes, but since 2013, Egypt has been fighting an ongoing Islamist insurgency that has killed of hundreds of policemen and soldiers. A week before the dismissal, sixteen policemen were killed during a police operation in the western desert of Giza province, and two high level security personnel for Giza were also dismissed. Hegazy was given a position of security advisor to the president. He is a member of the Supreme Council of the Armed Forces.

Military education
 Bachelor of Military Sciences, Egyptian Military Academy
 The Advanced Course, Egyptian Military Academy
 The Sophisticated course, Egyptian Military Academy
 M.A. of Military sciences, Egyptian Joint Command and staff college
 War Course, Fellowship of the Higher War College, Nasser's Military Sciences Academy
 Advanced Armor course, USA

Main commands
 Armored Battalion, commander
 Armored Brigade, Chief of staff
 Armored Brigade, commander
 Armored Division, Chief of staff
 Defense Attache, England
 Armored Division, commander
 Western Military Region, Chief of staff
 Western Military Region, commander
 Management and administration authority, Chief 
 Military Intelligence, Chief

Awards and decorations
 25 April Decoration (Liberation of Sinai)
 Distinguished Service Decoration
 Military Duty Decoration, Third Class
 Military Duty Decoration, Second Class 
 Military Duty Decoration, First Class
 Distinguished Tank Commanders Badge, First Class
 Longevity and Exemplary Medal
 Liberation of Kuwait Medal
 Silver Jubilee of October War Medal
 Golden Jubilee of the 23rd of July Revolution
 Silver Jubilee of the Liberation of Sinai Medal
 25 January Revolution Medal
Family
Abdelhamid Hegazi :son of Hegzai official Egypt delegate in the United Nations for 1999-2010, The milliliter president assistant 2014-2018
Omar Abdelhamid : Grandson of Mahmoud Hegazi, presidential delegate for Egypt 2030, First LGBTQI+ Activist from a diplomatic background in Egypt .
Alaa Hegazi : Social security head 2016-2020, Husband of the president Abdelfattah el sisi daughter

References

1953 births
Living people
Chiefs of the General Staff (Egypt)
Egyptian Military Academy alumni
Directors of the Military Intelligence and Reconnaissance (Egypt)
Members of the Supreme Council of the Armed Forces